Alvoco das Várzeas is a civil parish in the municipality of Oliveira do Hospital, Portugal, with 10.73 km2 and 320 inhabitants (2011). Density: 29.8 inhabitants/km2

History 
It is believed that Alvôco Várzeas is a very old village. The appearance of the millstones and mills and the legacy of anthroponyms that still exist today in Alvôco prove that this settlement was occupied by the Romans due, perhaps, to the vicinity of mineral holdings in meadows of  Alvôco River.

In this locality can visit the parish church that has as its patron saint Stº. Andrew, being a masterpiece of architecture in continuation of the regional tradition from the 19th century

As a cause of greater interest in the parish, and obligatory visit, is its Medieval Bridge, although known by popular tradition as "Roman Bridge". National Monument. It is thought to have been built in the 14th century. It is a good masonry construction, very singulada, of two arcs. The main arc is a curve broken, gothic quarter, and of great openness; the other, smaller, trace is irregular but semicircular canal. Is of two waters, being the branch of the right margin more extensive and very steep slope. Measure about seventy meters in length.

Along the bridge there is a fluvial beach and a picnic park, in the riverside area of Rio Alvôco (perhaps the least polluted water course of Europe).

Population

References

Freguesias of Oliveira do Hospital